Carlos Villa (December 11, 1936 – March 23, 2013) was a Filipino-American visual artist, curator and faculty member in the Painting Department at the San Francisco Art Institute. His work often explored the meaning of cultural diversity and sought to expand awareness of multicultural issues in the arts.

Early life and education
Carlos Villa was born on December 11, 1936 in San Francisco, California, to immigrant parents in the Tenderloin District. He was introduced to art when taking lessons with his cousin, Leo Valledor, who taught him to study etchings by Matisse. 

Villa started to display his work in 1958 and went on to receive a B.F.A. in Education in 1961 from the California School of Fine Arts (now known as San Francisco Art Institute), and a subsequent M.F.A. degree in Painting in 1963 from Mills College. He studied under Richard Diebenkorn, Elmer Bischoff, Frank Lobdell, and Ralph DuCasse.

Art career
In the early 1960s, Villa was associated with the Park Place Gallery Group in New York City and he was working as a minimalist, with a focus on textures. He moved back to San Francisco in 1969, ready to approach his work in a new manner.

Villa created multimedia projects and performances that he called "Actions"; these were often group collaborations which dealt with multicultural topics. In 1976, Villa curated a multidisciplinary, multiethnic exhibition entitled Other Sources: An American Essay, that showcased work by Bay Area artists of color. This exhibition was an alternative celebration of the United States Bicentennial, and focused on people of color and women. It showcased artists including Ruth Asawa, Bernice Bing, Rolando Castellón, Claude Clark, Robert Colescott, Frank Day, Rupert García, Mike Henderson, Oliver Lee Jackson, Frank LaPena, Linda Lomahaftewa, George Longfish, Ralph Maradiaga, José Montoya, Manuel Neri, Mary Lovelace O'Neal, Darryl Sapien, Raymond Saunders, James Hiroshi Suzuki, Horace Washington, Al Wong, René Yañez, Leo Valledor. Live performances by Winston and Mary Tong, Mark Izu and Ray Robles, poetry readings by Janice Mirikitani, Jessica Hagedorn, and Al Robles, and numerous others.

In 1985, he had a retrospective exhibition, Carlos Villa:1961–1984, held at the C.N. Gorman Museum and at the Memorial Union Art Gallery at the University of California, Davis.

In 1995, Villa published Worlds in Collision, a book on multiculturalism in the arts. The contents were transcriptions of presentations and discussions held during the San Francisco Art Institute’s symposia series entitled Sources of a Distinct Majority (1989-1991). The Worlds In Collision project continued in subsequent symposia, web projects and courses until 2013.

In 2010, Villa organized Rehistoricizing Abstract Expressionism in the San Francisco Bay Area, 1950s-1960s, a web project, symposium and exhibition at The Luggage Store Gallery that focused attention on contributions by women and artists of color (primarily abstract expressionist painters) that were overlooked by art history.

In 2011, Villa had a solo retrospective of his work entitled Manongs, Some Doors and a Bouquet of Crates at the Mission Cultural Center for Latino Arts in San Francisco. In 2020, Villa was part of the group exhibition Prospect.5: Yesterday We Said Tomorrow at Prospect New Orleans.

He was also the subject of the book Carlos Villa and the Integrity of Spaces (Meritage Press, 2011) an anthology of essays about his work and influence edited by Theodore S. Gonzalves, featuring essays and poetry by Bill Berkson, David A.M. Goldberg, Theodore S. Gonzalves, Mark Dean Johnson, Margo Machida, and Moira Roth.

Teaching 
Villa was a faculty member in the Painting Department at the San Francisco Art Institute where he started teaching in 1969. In the 1970s, Villa taught at California State University, Sacramento.

Death 
Villa died March 23, 2013 in San Francisco from cancer and is survived by his wife, Mary Valledor, daughter Sydney and stepson Rio Valledor. Mary's first husband and the father of Rio was Leo Valledor, Carlos' cousin.

Exhibitions 
 1977 – Look, Touch, Rub, Pull, Smell, and Hear, included Carlos Villa, Chisato Nishioka Watanabe, Phil Weidman, Phil Hitchcock, Jock Reynold, Laureen Landau, Sylvia Lark, William Maxwell, Bruce Guttin, Paul DeMarinis, and Jim Pomeroy, Artspace, Sacramento, California
 1985 – Carlos Villa: 1961–1984, solo retrospective, C.N. Gorman Museum and at the Memorial Union Art Gallery, University of California, Davis
 1987 – The Ethnic Idea, curated by Andrée Maréchal-Workman, including Lauren Adams, Robert Colescott, Dewey Crumpler, Mildred Howard, Oliver Lee Jackson, Mary Lovelace O'Neal, Joe Sam, Elisabeth Zeilon, Tom Holland, Celeste Conner, Jean LaMarr, Sylvia Lark, Leta Ramos, Judy Foosaner, Joseph Goldyne, Belinda Chlouber, Carlos Villa, Berkeley Art Center, Berkeley, California
 2022 – Carlos Villa: Worlds in Collision (solo exhibition), San Francisco Arts Commission Main Gallery, War Memorial Veterans Building, San Francisco, California
 2022 – Carlos Villa: Roots and Reinvention (solo exhibition), Asian Art Museum, San Francisco, California

Awards 

 1959 – Honorable Mention, Richmond Art Center, Richmond, California,
 1973 – National Endowment for the Arts Grant,
 1973 – Adaline Kent Award, San Francisco Art Institute (SFAI), San Francisco, California,
 1987, 2000 – Guest Artist, American Academy in Rome, Rome, Italy,
 1989 – Distinguished Alumni Award, San Francisco Art Institute,
 1997 – Pollock-Krasner Foundation Award,
 1998 – Flintridge Foundation Grant,
 2000 – Pamana Award, Filipino American Art Exposition, 
 2012 – Guggenheim Fellowship, Creative Arts, Fine Arts.

References

External links 
 Carlos Villa's official website (artist estate website)
 Website for the exhibition, Rehistoricizing Abstract Expressionism in the San Francisco Bay Area, 1950s-1960s
 Oral History interview with Carlos Villa, June 20-July 10, 1995, from the Archives of American Art, Smithsonian Institution

1936 births
Artists from San Francisco
American artists of Filipino descent
2013 deaths
Mills College alumni
San Francisco Art Institute faculty
San Francisco Art Institute alumni
Artists from the San Francisco Bay Area
California State University, Sacramento faculty